La Veuve, ou Le traître trahi (The Widow, or The Betrayer Betrayed) is a French verse comedy in five acts by Pierre Corneille, which takes place in Paris. The play was probably first performed early in 1632 by the troupe of Charles Le Noir and Montdory at the Sphère, a rather seedy nightclub in Paris. It was first published in 1634.

Roles 
 Philiste, in love with Clarice
 Alcidon, friend of Philiste and in love with Doris
 Célidan, friend of Alcidon and beloved of Doris
 Clarice, widow of Alcandre and mistress of Philiste
 Chrysante, mother of Doris
 Doris, sister of Philiste
 Clarice's nurse
 Géron, official of Florange, enamored with Doris
 Lycaste, servant of Philiste
 Polymax, Doraste, Listor, servants of Clarice

References
Notes

Sources
 Corneille, Pierre (1634). La veuve in Laplace 1869, pp. 60–85.
 Deierkauf-Holsboer, Wilma (1954). Le théâtre du Marais. I. La période de gloire et de fortune, 1634 (1629) – 1648. Paris: Nizet. .
 Garreau, Joseph (1984). "Corneille, Pierre" in Hochman 1984, vol. 1, pp. 545–554.
 Hochman, Stanely, editor (1984). McGraw-Hill Encyclopedia of World Drama (second edition, 5 volumes). New York: McGraw-Hill. .
 Laplace, A., publisher (1869). Oeuvres de P. Corneille: théatre complet. Paris: A. Laplace. View at Google Books.

Plays by Pierre Corneille